The Law Cafe is a South Korean television series starring Lee Seung-gi and Lee Se-young. It aired on KBS2 from September 5 to October 25, 2022, airing every Monday and Tuesday at 21:50 (KST) for 16 episodes.

Synopsis
The Law Cafe tells the love story of Kim Jeong-ho (Lee Seung-gi), a former prosecutor who is known as "Monster Genius", and Kim Yu-ri (Lee Se-young), a beautiful lawyer with a four-dimensional personality.

Cast

Main
 Lee Seung-gi as Kim Jeong-ho
 A former prosecutor known as the "Monster Genius". He is currently the owner of a building which houses a law firm that also operates as a cafe.
 Lee Se-young as Kim Yu-ri
 A beautiful lawyer with a somewhat eccentric personality. She opens a Law Cafe after resigning from Hwang & Gu Law Firm.

Supporting

Eunha Building Family
 Kim Nam-hee as Park Woo-jin 
 Kim Jeong-ho's cousin and Director of Barun Mental Health Clinic.
 Ahn Dong-goo as Seo Eun-kang 
 A quiet barista with a handsome face.
 Kim Do-hoon as Bae Joon 
 A part-time worker at Law Cafe. He is a law student who is taking time off from law school.
 Jang Hye-jin as Kim Cheon-daek
 Owner of a happy supermarket across the street from the Eunha building.
 Baek Hyun-joo as Mrs. Choi
 Owner of a bakery across the street from the Eunha building.

Others
 Kim Seul-gi as Han Se-yeon 
 A police officer who has been a friend of both Kim Jeong-ho and Kim Yu-ri for the past 17 years. She is bold and outspoken.
 Oh Dong-min as Do Jin-ki 
 A restaurant chef and Han Se-yeon's husband.
 Jo Han-chul as Lee Pyun-woong 
 Representative of Dohan Construction and the son of President Lee.
 Jeon Guk-hwan as President Lee / Lee Byung-ok 
 Representative of Dohan group.
 Jeon No-min as Kim Seung-woon
 Kim Jeong-ho's father and head of the Seoul Central District Prosecutor's Office. He is the son-in-law of the Dohan group.
 Kim Won-hae as CEO Hwang
 Representative of law firm Hwang & Gu Law Firm.
 Hwang Young-hee as Song Ok-ja
 Kim Yu-ri's mother.

Extended
 Lee Min-young as Chae Song-hwa 
 A single mother who lives in the same neighborhood as Kim Jeong-ho.
 Shin Seung-hwan as President Kim 
 The owner of the publisher where Kim Jeong-ho is publishing his novel.
 Kim Ba-da as Yo-han 
 Customers visiting the coffee shop.
 Kwon Da-ham
 Lee Mi-sook as Lee Yeon-joo
 Kim Jeong-ho's mother is warm like Ondol and bright as the sun.
 Ahn Se-bin as Kang Yi-seul 
 Songhwa's daughter.

Special appearances
 Kim Jae-hwa as Geum-ja
 A real estate broker in Golden Real Estate.
 Jo Bok-rae as Jo Seok-hoon
 A customer at Park Woo-jin's clinic.
 Go Geon-han as Attorney Meng 
 A defense lawyer and Kim Yu-ri's opponent.
 Park Sang-hoon as Hong Ji-hoon 
 School villain. The 'King of the End' is eviler than a simple high school gang.
 Kim Ja-young as Na Mak-rye 
 Grandma lives on the island, where Jeong-ho and Yu-ri visit for legal advice.
 Kim Young-ok as Wol-seon 
 Grandma who lives on the island Jungpyeong-do, where Kim Jeong-ho and Kim Yu-ri came to consult the law.
 Shin So-yul as Da-young 
 Park Woo-jin's Patient Later, she became a stalker who followed Park Woo-jin because she liked him.
 Lee Jae-yong as Choi Yeo-hwan 
 Member of the Korean Party in Parliament in which he had harassed Chae Song-hwa.
 Oh Min-suk as Baek Geon-man 
 Kim Yu-ri's ex-boyfriend. He is currently the prosecutor responsible for Songhwa's case.

Original soundtrack

Part 1

Part 2

Part 3

Part 4

Part 5

Part 6

Part 7

Part 8

Part 9

Production

Release
The series was initially scheduled to premiere on August 29, 2022, but was pushed back to September 5.

Filming 
On October 13, 2022, it was reported that filming had ended.

Viewership

Awards and nominations

References

External links
  
 
 
 

Korean Broadcasting System television dramas
Korean-language television shows
2022 South Korean television series debuts
2022 South Korean television series endings
Television shows based on South Korean webtoons
South Korean romance television series
South Korean legal television series